Reicheidius frondicola is a species of beetle in the family Carabidae, the only species in the genus Reicheidius.

References

Scaritinae